The University of Bern is a university in the Swiss capital of Bern and was founded in 1834. It is regulated and financed by the Canton of Bern. It is a comprehensive university offering a broad choice of courses and programs in eight faculties and some 150 institutes. With around 19,000 students, the University of Bern is the third largest university in Switzerland.

Organization 

The University of Bern operates at three levels: university, faculties and institutes. Other organizational units include interfaculty and general university units. The university's highest governing body is the Senate, which is responsible for issuing statutes, rules and regulations. Directly answerable to the Senate is the University Board of Directors, the governing body for university management and coordination. The board comprises the rector, the vice-rectors and the administrative director. The structures and functions of the University Board of Directors and the other organizational units are regulated by the Universities Act.
The University of Bern had 19,297 students in 2022. Of these, 42 percent (8,056) were registered in bachelor programs and 24 percent (4,610) in master's programs, 17 percent (3,371) were doctoral students, and another 17 percent (3,260) were enrolled in continuing education programs. There were 1,667 bachelor's degree graduation, 1,603 master's degree graduations and 725 PhD student graduations in 2021. For some time now, the university has had more female than male students. At the end of 2022, women accounted for 59% of students.

Physical environment 

The University of Bern does not have a single large campus on the edge of the city, but has consistently pursued the principle of a university in the city. Most institutes and clinics are still in the Länggasse, the traditional university district adjoining the city centre,  within walking distance of one another. The Faculty of Theology and various institutes in the Faculty of Humanities are now housed in an old chocolate factory (the Unitobler), and in 2005 the former women's hospital was refurbished to serve as a university centre for institutes in the Faculty of Law and Department of Economics (the UniS). The vonRoll site, another former factory building, is in the process of being refurbished to house the Faculty of Human Sciences and the Department of Social Sciences.

History

Early history: Collegiate school and academy (1500–1834) 
The roots of the University of Bern go back to the sixteenth century, when, as a consequence of the Reformation, a collegiate school was needed to train new pastors. As part of its reorganization of higher education, the government of Bern transformed the existing theological college into an academy with four faculties in 1805. Henceforth, it was possible to study not only theology in Bern, but also law and medicine.

The old university: New beginning and development (1834–1900) 
As in other countries of Europe, nineteenth century politics in Switzerland were dominated by the struggle between conservative and liberal currents. The liberals gained control of the Canton of Bern in 1831 and in 1834 turned the academy into a university, with an academic staff of 45 to teach 167 students. Owing to the political situation, it was not until the promulgation of the federal constitution in 1848 that the university was able to embark on a period of peaceful development. Between 1885 and 1900, the number of students doubled from 500 to 1,000. As a result, at the turn of the twentieth century the University of Bern was the largest university in Switzerland. This rapid growth reflected the university's attraction for foreign students, in particular Germans and Russians, who accounted for half of the total enrolment. It was also Russian female students who in the 1870s won the right for women to study.

The new university: New building and consolidation (1900–1950) 
With the growing prosperity of the city of Bern, the university in the Länggasse quarter expanded at the end of the 19th century. In 1903, a new Main Building was inaugurated on the Grosse Schanze and the number of faculties increased. In 1908–09, three prominent persons put the University of Bern in the limelight. In 1908, Albert Einstein taught the first of three semesters of theoretical physics. The following year, Anna Tumarkin, a Russian philosopher, was appointed to an extraordinary professorship and thus became the first female professor at a European university entitled to examine doctoral and post-doctoral theses. Also in 1909, Theodor Kocher, a Bernese surgeon, was awarded the Nobel Prize in Medicine. In the following years the university consolidated its position as a small centre of higher learning with a stable enrollment of about 2,000 students.

The modern university: Expansion and reorganization (1950–2000) 
After World War II, a growing number of voices called for the expansion of tertiary education in Switzerland. The rapid growth in the 1950s and 1960s (enrolment at the University of Bern had already reached 5,000 in 1968) – generated pressure for expansion. The  completely revised University Act of 1996 transformed the University of Bern from an administrative division of the Department of Education of the Canton of Bern into an autonomous institution. a legal entity in its own right. The Act clearly defined the competencies of the university and of the state. The university passed another milestone in 1992, when its enrolment reached 10,000.

The university today: Bologna Reform and restructuring (since 2000) 
The Bologna Declaration ushered in the era of ECTS credits and the bachelor's and master's degree structure. The university set strategic research priorities, such as climate research, and promoted inter-university cooperation. At the same time, the university reorganized its faculties. With the amendment to the University Act in summer 2010, the University Board of Directors acquired the right to choose its own ordinary professors and keep its own accounts separate from the state.
The University Board of Directors formulated a strategy in 2013, that  builds on the previous strategy of 2006, the 2012 mission statement and the performance mandate for the university from the Cantonal Government.

Structure

Faculties 

The University of Bern has eight faculties:
 Theology
 Law
 Business, Economics and Social Sciences
 Medicine
 Veterinary Medicine (Vetsuisse)
 Humanities
 Science
 Human Sciences

The medical faculties of the Universities of Bern and Basel have formed a strategic alliance in the fields of cardiac surgery, neurosurgery, pathology and microbiology. The Vetsuisse Faculty was created in 2006 through the merger of the Faculties of veterinary medicine of the Universities of Bern and Zurich. The Humanities Faculty is comparable to the arts and sciences departments of American universities and offers majors in the three areas of art and culture, archaeology and history, and languages and literature. The Faculty of Science focuses on the natural and life sciences. The Human Sciences Faculty was founded in 2005 and offers study programmes in education, sports and psychology.

General university institutions 
There are six centres with specialized roles and interfaculty units maintained by the University of Bern:
 Collegium generale (CG)
 Walter Benjamin Kolleg (WBKolleg)
 Interdisciplinary Centre for Gender Studies (ICFG)
 Microscopy Imaging Center (MIC)
 Experimental Animal Center (EAC)
 Centre for Continuing University Education (Zentrum für universitäre Weiterbildung, ZUW)

The function of these general university institutions is to promote dialogue between students in different disciplines and faculties through interdisciplinary events for academic staff and students. The Centre for Continuing University Education (ZUW) focuses on scientific further education. The selection of topics in the ZUW programmes ranges from public administration through dentistry to spiritual guidance. In addition, the University of Bern has also taken the lead in the German-speaking world in creating a number of novel study programmes, for instance Evaluation.

Interdisciplinary centres 

The university has defined specific focuses of research as strategic and has established interdisciplinary centres of excellence for these that pursue an interdisciplinary approach to research and teaching. For example, the biomedical engineering programmes of the Artificial Organ (ARTORG) Center for Biomedical Engineering Research and the Public Management and Policy programme of the Center of Competence for Public Management (CCPM).

There are 10 strategic centres and interfaculty units at the University of Bern:
 Albert Einstein Center for Fundamental Physics (AEC)
 ARTORG Center for Biomedical Engineering Research
 Bern Center for Precision Medicine (BCPM)
 Centre for Development and Environment (CDE)
 Center for Regional Economic Development (CRED)
 Center for Space and Habitability (CSH)
 Center of Competence for Public Management (KPM)
 Multidisciplinary Center for Infectious Diseases (MCID)
 Oeschger Centre for Climate Change Research (OCCR)
 World Trade Institute (WTI)

A number of the university's centers of excellence focus on the challenges of sustainability. The Centre for Development and Environment (CDE) manages research programmes in the field of sustainable development, focusing on its particular areas of expertise in integrated regional development and natural resource management. The World Trade Institute (WTI) manages research, education, and outreach focused on global economic governance, including global sustainability policy. The Oeschger Centre for Climate Change Research (OCCR) is at the forefront of international research on climate science and policy, and its researchers have participated as co-chair, coordinating lead authors or lead authors in all the assessment reports so far published by the IPCC.

The Center for Regional Economic Development (CRED) is an interfaculty center for research, teaching and consulting in regional economic development. Researchers from the research units Economics, Entrepreneurship, Geography and Tourism deal with research questions regarding the following research areas: Location dynamics and regional economic policy, Tourism as well as Land use policy and real estate.

The Center for Space and Habitability (CSH) leads the European CHEOPS (CHaracterising ExOPlanets Satellite) project. CHEOPS is a planned European space telescope for the study of the formation of extrasolar planets, with a launch window in October to November 2019.

Several of the centers offer specialized graduate programmes. For example: the biomedical engineering programmes of the Artificial Organ (ARTORG) Center for Biomedical Engineering Research; the Public Management and Policy programme of the Center of Competence for Public Management (CCPM); the WTI (offering MAS, LLM, and PhD programs in international economics and economic law); and the OCCR graduate school (offersing an MSc and a PhD program in Climate Sciences, as well as a Swiss Climate Summer School).

Academic Programs 

As a comprehensive university, Bern covers a wide range of classical university courses in some 39 bachelor, 71 master and 69 advanced study programs. The Physics Institute contributed to the first flight to the moon and still carries out experiments and provides apparatus for NASA and ESA space missions on a regular basis.

In addition to the classical disciplines, the University of Bern has also established programmes in newer ones such as sports science and theatre studies. It is the only institution in Switzerland with a theatre studies course that enables students to major in dance in their master program. 
The University of Bern also offers the Master in Applied Economic Analysis (MAEA), which is the only university-level program in Switzerland with focus on applied economic analysis. The Graduate Schools for doctoral candidates offer further-reaching programmes that are closely linked to the university's  research priorities in the fields of climate science, health care and penal law and criminology.

Notable people

Professors 

A number of professors at the University of Bern were pioneers in their field. The Russian-born Anna Tumarkin was the first female professor in Europe with the right to examine doctoral and post-doctoral students. The physician Gabriel Gustav Valentin was the first Jewish professor to be elected to a chair at a German-speaking university. Theodor Oskar Rubeli was co-responsible for founding the first faculty of veterinary medicine in the world. Finally, the ice core analyses of physicist Hans Oeschger played a pioneering role in the development of climate research.
Other notable academics at the University of Bern include (by faculty):
Theology
Eduard Herzog, Ulrich Luz, Adolf Schlatter, Lukas Vischer, Eduard Zeller
Law
Carl Hilty, Eugen Huber
Medicine
Jakob Klaesi, Emil Theodor Kocher, Hugo Kronecker, Theodor Langhans, Ludwig Lichtheim, Maurice Edmond Müller, Fritz de Quervain, Hermann Sahli, Gabriel Gustav Valentin, Esther Fischer-Homberger
Humanities
Andreas Alföldi, Elisabeth Ettlinger, Carl Heinrich Wilhelm Hagen, Walther Killy, Julius Pokorny, Ignaz Paul Vitalis Troxler, Anna Tumarkin, Hermann Usener, George van Driem
Natural sciences
Albert Einstein, Heinrich Greinacher, Hans Oeschger, Ludwig Schläfli, Bernhard Studer, Hugo von Mohl, Heinrich von Wild, Hugo Hadwiger
Economics
Alfred Amonn, Max Weber
Others
Theodor Oskar Rubeli

Students 
The following prominent persons studied at the University of Bern:

Researchers 
 Sir Paul Nurse – Nobel Prize in Physiology or Medicine 2001

Honorary doctorates 
In the course of its history, the University of Bern has awarded honorary doctorates to outstanding people for contributions in different fields of society.

Medicine
Sir Edward Albert Sharpey-Schafer, Sir Charles Scott Sherrington, César Roux, SIr Alan Lloyd Hodgkin, Georg von Békésy, Stephen W. Kuffler, George Emil Palade, Willy Burgdorfer, Iván Böszörményi-Nagy, David Sackett, Luc Pettavino
Natural sciences
Johann Büttikofer, Hans von Euler-Chelpin, Gerold Schwarzenbach, Richard R. Ernst, David Southwood
Economics and business
Ernst Karl Abbe, Auguste and Louis Lumière, Jean-Daniel Gerber, Thomas J. Sargent, Maureen O'Hara (professor)
Humanities
Albert Samuel Gatschet, Erwin Heinz Ackerknecht
Art
Joseph Simon Volmar, Albert Anker, Cuno Amiet, Rudolf Münger, Alberto Giacometti, Walter Linsenmaier, Ilya Kabakov
Literature
Charles Ferdinand Ramuz, René Gardi, Kurt Marti, Stefan Heym, John Edgar Wideman, John le Carré, Eveline Hasler
Politics
Charles Albert Gobat, Rudolf Minger, Annemarie Huber-Hotz, Adolf Ogi, Angela Merkel, Prince Albert II of Monaco
Others
Hermann Müller-Thurgau, Eduard Herzog, Mathis Wackernagel, Heidi Tagliavini, Hannah Cotton, Stephen Kosslyn

Rankings 

Today the University of Bern is one of the top 150 universities in the world. In the QS World University Rankings 2023 it ranked 120th. The Shanghai Ranking (ARWU) 2022 ranked the University of Bern in the range 101st–150th in the world. In the Leiden Ranking 2021 it ranked 180th in the world. In the Times Higher Education World University Rankings it ranked 94th in 2023.

See also 
 List of largest universities by enrollment in Switzerland
 List of modern universities in Europe (1801–1945)
 List of universities in Switzerland

Notes and references

Bibliography 
 Im Hof, Ulrich et al. (ed.). Hochschulgeschichte Berns 1528–1984. Zur 150-Jahr-Feier der Universität Bern 1984. Bern: Universität Bern, 1984.
 Im Hof, Ulrich et al. (ed.). Die Dozenten der bernischen Hochschule. Ergänzungsband zu: Hochschulgeschichte Berns 1528–1984. Bern: Universität Bern, 1984.
 Rogger, Franziska. "Die Universität Bern und ihre gesammelte(n) Geschichte(n)", UniPress, 139 (December 2008), pp. 12–31.
 Rogger, Franziska, and Bankowski, Monika. Ganz Europa blickt auf uns! Das schweizerische Frauenstudium und seine russischen Pionierinnen. Baden: Hier + jetzt Verlag für Kultur und Geschichte GmbH, 2010.

External links 
University of Bern 
University of Bern 
University of Bern 
History of the University of Bern 
Website of the Swiss National Science Foundation 

 
University of Bern
Educational institutions established in 1834
Buildings and structures in Bern
1834 establishments in Switzerland
Schools in Bern